Achaea is a subdivision of Greece.

Achaea or Achaia may also refer to:

History
Achaeans (Homer), a collective name for the Greeks of the Mycenaean period used by Homer
 Achaeans (tribe), one of the four major tribes of Classical Greece
Achaea (ancient region), an ancient Greek region in the north of the Peloponnese
Achaea Phthiotis, an ancient Greek region in southeastern Thessaly
Achaean League, a league of North Peloponnesian cities during the Hellenistic period
 Achaean War, in 146 BC
 Achaea (Roman province), comprising Peloponnese and central Greece
Principality of Achaea, a medieval crusader state in the Peloponesse
 Achaea (constituency), a constituency of the Greek Parliament

Other uses
Achaea, or Demeter Achaea, an epithet of the goddess Demeter
Achaea, or Minerva Achaea, an epithet of the goddess Minerva
Achaea, Dreams of Divine Lands, a multi-player online computer game
Achaea (moth), a genus of noctuid moths
1150 Achaia, asteroid
Achaia Channel, a Greek local TV station
Achaia Clauss, a Greek winery
 Achaja, a Polish fantasy series of novels (published 2002–2004)
Achaia, the main alien race in Another Life (2019 TV series)

See also
Achaeans (disambiguation)
Archaea
 West Achaea, a municipality in Achaea
 Kato Achaia (lit. Lower Achaea) and Ano Achaia (lit. Upper Achaea), towns in Achaea